The HTC U Play is a mid-range Android smartphone manufactured and sold by HTC as part of the HTC U series. It was announced alongside the HTC U Ultra on January 12, 2017.

Specifications

Hardware 
The HTC U Play features a curved glass back with an aluminum frame. It includes a non-removable 2500 mAH battery and a 5.2-inch IPS LCD display with Gorilla Glass. It comes with either 3 GB RAM and 32 GB of storage or 4 GB RAM and 64 GB of storage. The HTC U Play also supports a microSD card.

Software 
The HTC U Play shipped with Android 6.0 Marshmallow with the HTC Sense UI.

Release 
The device was released on March 1, 2017 in the United Kingdom and on March 8, 2017 in Australia. The device was also released in some other countries around the globe.

References 

U Play
Android (operating system) devices
Mobile phones introduced in 2017
Discontinued smartphones